Verbania is the most populous comune (municipality) and the capital city of the province of Verbano-Cusio-Ossola in the Piedmont region of northwest Italy. It had a population of 30,827 at 1 January 2017.

History

The area has been inhabited since prehistoric times. The oldest known people living in the 
area were the Lepontii. The area was added to the Roman Empire by Emperor Augustus in the first century AD.

In the eleventh century the area was controlled by the bishops of Novara, then by the counts of Pombia. In 1152 Federico Barbarossa gave the area to the Castello family. After the death of Frederick Barbarossa, the territory was again controlled by Novara. By the fourteenth century, the area had become part of the Duchy of Milan. In 1714, following the Treaty of Rastatt most of the lake areas came under the control of the Habsburgs. After the  1796 Napoleonic invasion the area was controlled by the French. By 1818 the House of Savoy had gained control of the area back from the French. With the edict of 10 October 1836, Pallanza and Ossola became part of the province of Novara.

After the Second World War, the territory still remained part of the province of Novara. In 1976 the autonomous district of Verbano-Cusio-Ossola was established.

Overview

The present-day Verbania was created by the 1939 merger of the cities of Intra and Pallanza under royal decree 702. Since 1992 it has been the capital of the province of Verbano-Cusio-Ossola. A small islet lying a stone's throw from the shores of the Pallanza frazione and separated from it by a narrow stretch of water just 10 or 15 metres wide, known as the Isolino di San Giovanni, is famous for having been the home of Arturo Toscanini between the years of 1927 and 1952.

Verbania consists of the following localities: Antoliva, Bieno, Biganzolo, Cavandone, Fondotoce, Intra, Pallanza, Possaccio, Suna, Torchiedo, Trobaso and Zoverallo.

Climate
The climate is temperate, humid, with hot summer and continental type influences in the inland and higher areas. The area is characterized by cold winters and hot summers.

Government

Main sights

Giardini Botanici Villa Taranto is an estate with fine botanical gardens.

Transport
Verbania-Pallanza railway station, opened in 1905, forms part of the Milan–Domodossola railway.  It is in the Fondotoce district, between Lake Mergozzo and the river Toce, just upstream from where the Toce flows into Lake Maggiore. A bus connects Verbania to the rail station in Fondotoce.

International relations

Twin towns – Sister cities
Verbania is twinned with the following cities and towns:

  Bourg-de-Péage, France
   Crikvenica, Croatia
   East Grinstead, United Kingdom
   Mindelheim, Germany
  Sant Feliu de Guíxols, Spain
 Schwaz, Austria
  Piatra Neamț, Romania
 Hendersonville, North Carolina, USA

Notable people
 Beniamino Bonomi (b. 1968), canoeist
 Emanuela Brizio (b. 1968), mountain runner
 Luigi Cadorna (1850–1928), Field Marshal of Italy during World War I
 Raffaele Cadorna, Jr. (1889–1973), general
 Filippo Ganna (b. 1996), cyclist
 Wilfried Gnonto (b. 2003), footballer
 Elisa Longo Borghini (b. 1991), cyclist
 Emma Morano (1899–2017), former world's oldest living person from 12 May 2016 until her death on 15 April 2017
 Angelo Pagotto (b. 1973), footballer
 Daniele Ranzoni (1843-1889), artist
 Bernhard Riemann (1826–1866), mathematician

See also
 S.S. Verbania Calcio
 István Türr#Pallanza Dignitary
 Intra
 Pallanza

References

External links

 Official website 
 Official Tourism Gateway Lake Maggiore Official Tourism Gateway

 
Cities and towns in Piedmont
Populated places on Lake Maggiore